The 1995–96 EHF Women's Cup Winners' Cup was the twentieth edition of EHF's competition for women's handball national cup champions. It ran from October 6, 1995, to May 12, 1996. Latvia made its debut, while Yugoslavia returned after 3 seasons of exclusion. Yugoslavia's Bolago Voždovac faced Croatia's Kras Zagreb in the same week the Croatian War ended, with the Croats making it to the quarterfinals.

The final confronted the 1991 European Cup and EHF Cup champions. TV Lützellinden, which had lost the final in the previous season, defeated Kras Zagreb to win its second Cup Winners' Cup and the last of its three European trophies. As of 2013 it remains the last German champion of the competition.

Results

References

Women's EHF Cup Winners' Cup
1995 in handball
1996 in handball